Poppy is a musical comedy in three acts with music by Stephen Jones and Arthur Samuels (additional music by John Egan), and lyrics and book by Dorothy Donnelly, with contributions also from Howard Dietz, W. C. Fields and Irving Caesar. The musical introduced songs such as "Two Make a Home", "On Our Honeymoon", "What Do You Do Sunday, Mary?" and "Alibi Baby".  The story, set in 1874 Connecticut, concerns a circus barker and con man, Prof. Eustace McGargle, who tries to pass off his foster daughter, Poppy, as a long-lost heiress.  It turns out that Poppy really is an heiress.

The original New York City production opened at the Apollo Theater on September 3, 1923, and ran for a successful 346 performances, closing on June 28, 1924. It starred Madge Kennedy as Poppy, with Fields as Prof. McGargle, and Robert Woolsey and Jimmy Barry. It was directed by Dorothy Donnelly and Julian Alfred, with choreography by Julian Alfred.  The New York run was followed by a touring production.  The piece then had a London production at the Gaiety Theatre in 1924.  The musical included elements of revue, including specialty numbers.  Its success established Fields' comic con man persona and led to film versions, also starring Fields.

Synopsis

In the late 19th century, Prof. Eustace McGargle, a juggler and hustler who runs a traveling circus, adopts an orphan, Poppy.  He teaches her to be a con artist. When the circus passes through a small town, Poppy meets a wealthy local boy, William. McGargle learns that Princess Vronski Mameluke Pasha Tubbs has a long-lost daughter, and he tries to pass Poppy off as the heiress. In the end she turns out to be the true heir and marries William.

Musical numbers

Act1
Stepping Around – Mary, Amos and Ensemble
The Girl I've Never Met – William and Dancers
Hang Your Sorrows in the Sun (music by Egan) – Poppy 
Two Make a Home – Poppy and William
Kadoola Kadoola Solo – Prof. McGargle
When Men Are Alone – Mortimer, Dancers and Ensemble
Fortune Telling – Poppy and Boys

 Act 2
The Dancing Lesson (music by Egan)  – Dancers and Ensemble
Alibi Baby (lyrics by Dietz) – Mary and Ensemble
On Our Honeymoon – Poppy and William
Choose a Partner, Please – Poppy and Ensemble
Mary (lyrics by Caesar) – Mary, Mortimer, Dancers and Ensemble

Act 3
A Picnic Party with You (music by Egan) – Mary, Mortimer, Dancers and Ensemble

Roles and original Broadway cast

Amos Sniffen – Jimmy Barry
Judge Delafield – Hugh Chilvers
William Van Wyck – Alan Edwards
Prof. Eustace McGargle – W. C. Fields
Mary Delafield – Luella Gear
Princess Vronski Mameluke Pasha Tubbs – Emma Janvier
Poppy McGargle – Madge Kennedy
Sarah Tucker – Maude Ream Stover
Mortimer Pottle – Robert Woolsey

Film versions
The musical formed the basis for two film versions, both of which starred Fields reviving his blustery carnival-barker character, Eustice P. McGargle.  The first was Sally of the Sawdust (1925), a silent movie directed by D. W. Griffith and co-starring Carol Dempster as Sally; and the second was Poppy (1936), directed by A. Edward Sutherland.  Fields wore his goofy clip-on mustache for the 1925 production, as he did for most of his silent pictures. Fields was ill during the 1936 production, and a fairly obvious double was used in several scenes requiring physical exertion. He still managed a memorable performance, including these well-known lines spoken to his daughter Poppy (Rochelle Hudson):
"What a gorgeous day ... what effulgent sunshine ... effulgent sunshine, yes ... 'twas a day of this sort, the McGillicuddy brothers murdered their mother with an axe!"
"And if we should ever separate, my little plum, I want to give you just one bit of fatherly advice: 'Never give a sucker an even break!'"

References

External links
Poppy at the Internet Broadway Database
Poppy at the Guide to Musical Theatre
Sally of the Sawdust (film) at IMDB
Poppy (film) at IMDB

1923 musicals
1925 films
1936 films
Broadway musicals